Bendegúz Bóka (born 2 October 1993) is a Hungarian handballer for Balatonfüredi KSE and the Hungarian national team.

He represented Hungary at the 2019 World Men's Handball Championship.

References

External links

Champsport.hu
Pickhandball.hu

1993 births
Living people
Hungarian male handball players
People from Veszprém
SC Pick Szeged players
Sportspeople from Veszprém County